Fenzhou or Fen Prefecture (汾州) was a zhou (prefecture) in imperial China centering on modern Fenyang, Shanxi, China. It existed (intermittently) from 488 to 1912. During the Ming dynasty and Qing dynasty it was known as Fenzhou Prefecture (汾州府; Fenzhou Fu).

References
 

Prefectures of the Tang dynasty
Prefectures of Later Tang
Prefectures of Later Jin (Five Dynasties)
Prefectures of Later Han (Five Dynasties)
Prefectures of Northern Han
Prefectures of the Song dynasty
Prefectures of the Jin dynasty (1115–1234)
Prefectures of the Yuan dynasty
Prefectures of the Ming dynasty
Prefectures of the Qing dynasty
Former prefectures in Shanxi